The Afon Alun is a river in the Vale of Glamorgan, south Wales. It is a tributary of the Ewenny River, which it joins to the south of Bridgend.

Course
Two streams join near Llandow village to form the river: the Stembridge Brook and the Llandow Brook. After the confluence it flows in a broadly north-westerly direction following the route of the Vale of Glamorgan railway until it joins the Ewenny River just upstream of Ogmore Castle.

The river has one tributary, the Colwinston Brook, which, joins the river near the village of Colwinston.

References

External links
Photo at Flickr

Alun